Gawrony may refer to the following places in Poland:
Gawrony, Lower Silesian Voivodeship (south-west Poland)
Gawrony, Łęczyca County in Łódź Voivodeship (central Poland)
Gawrony, Opoczno County in Łódź Voivodeship (central Poland)
Gawrony, Greater Poland Voivodeship (west-central Poland)
Gawrony, Śrem County in Greater Poland Voivodeship (west-central Poland)